Kadidiatou Kanouté Tounkara OLY (born 11 June 1978) is a Malian women's basketball player. A member of the Mali women's national basketball team, Kanouté competed for Mali at the 2008 Summer Olympics.

References

1978 births
Living people
Malian women's basketball players
Olympic basketball players of Mali
Basketball players at the 2008 Summer Olympics
21st-century Malian people